John Baker was a member of the Wisconsin State Assembly.

Biography
Baker was born on July 17, 1869, in Evansville, Wisconsin. His father, Allen S. Baker, was also a member of the Assembly.

Career
Baker was a member of the Assembly during the 1927 session. He was a Republican.

References

People from Evansville, Wisconsin
Republican Party members of the Wisconsin State Assembly
1869 births
Year of death missing